Atta is an Austronesian dialect cluster spoken by the Aeta (Agta) Negritos of the northern Philippines.

Varieties
There are three varieties according to Ethnologue.
Faire Atta (Southern Atta): spoken near Faire, Rizal, Cagayan
Pamplona Atta (Northern Cagayan Negrito): spoken in Pamplona, Cagayan; similar to northern Ibanag
Pudtol Atta: spoken in Pudtol, Apayao, and the Abulog river area south of Pamplona

Villa Viciosa Atta, supposed once spoken in Villaviciosa, Abra, is presumed to be related, but is unattested.

Reid (1994) also reports the following locations for Southern Cagayan Agta.
Minanga, Peñablanca, Cagayan
Conyan, Minanga, Peñablanca, Cagayan
Sapinit, Maconacon, Isabela
Makagaw (Dupaninan), Cagayan

References

Aeta languages
Languages of Cagayan
Languages of Apayao
Cagayan Valley languages